The Dallas mayoral election of 1995 took place on May 6, 1995, to elect the mayor of Dallas, Texas. The race was officially nonpartisan. Ron Kirk won the election, taking a majority in the initial round of voting, thereby negating the need for a runoff to be held.

Results

References

Dallas
Dallas
1995
Non-partisan elections
1990s in Dallas